Gloria Christian (born 24 June 1934) is an Italian Canzone Napoletana singer, mainly successful between the second half of the 1950s and the 1960s.

Life and career 
Born in Bologna, the daughter of a Neapoletan trumpeter and of a Venetian mother, at early age Christian moved with her family to Naples, where she graduated at the Istituto Magistrale Pimentel Forseca. Still as a student, she was part of a jazz band and of the dance orchestra led by Renato Marini.  In 1956, she participated to the radio musical contest "La bacchetta d'oro", which got her an early popularity and a contract with the label Vis.  In 1957 she got her first hit, a cover version of "Que Sera, Sera" which ranked #3 on the Italian hit parade.

Between 1957 and 1962 Christian entered the main competition at the Sanremo Music Festival four times, getting two significant successes with the songs "Casetta in Canadà" (1957) and "Timida serenata" (1958). She also entered the competition at the Festival di Napoli ten times, getting a large success with her 1959 entry "Cerasella" and winning the competition in 1962 with the song "Marechiaro Marechiaro". In 1970 she was the presenter of the last edition of the festival.

During her career Christian was also active as an actress in musical comedies, notably appearing in Rugantino.

References

External links 

1934 births
Living people 
Musicians from Naples
Italian pop singers
Italian women singers